Deep space bands and near space bands are frequency bands that have been allocated to space research services by the International Telecommunication Union for use in deep space and near space research.

* = No assignment or not supported by the DSN

References

Microwave bands
Telemetry
Radio astronomy
Jet Propulsion Laboratory